Udaya Devi (Princess/Queen of the Rise/Morning) is an Express train that runs between Colombo Fort and Batticaloa in Sri Lanka.

The Udaya Devi is one of three trains that runs between Colombo Fort and Batticaloa.The other trains are Pulathisi Intercity train and Night mail train that  runs between Colombo and Batticaloa. Batticaloa-bound train departs from Colombo at 6.05 a.m. while Colombo-bound train departs from Batticaloa at 6:00 a.m.

Stops
There are 34 stops when going to Colombo, While there is 35 stops going to Batticaloa.

Colombo Fort to Batticaloa Train Stops

Batticaloa to Colombo Fort Train Stops

Services 
The train offers two classes
Second class is more comfortable than the third class, But more expensive and provides better facilities than Third class.
Third class typically gets very crowded with commuters, And provide only the basic facilities.

Route

The Udaya Devi runs on the Main line to Polgahawela Junction, then turns to the Northern line and then from Maho Junction, it runs the entire Batticaloa line.

Rolling Stock
(Currently, as of August 13th, 2022. There is an ongoing trial to use Indian Built ICF coaches. The trail is on-going. However, If successful, it will continue to run with ICF coaches
The service runs by M2 or M6 locomotive pulling newer Tantri-built Romanian cars.

References
https://slrailwayforum.com/udaya-devi-express-train/

Named passenger trains of Sri Lanka
Rail transport in Eastern Province, Sri Lanka